The Michigan Journal of Gender & Law is a biannual law review published by an independent student group at the University of Michigan Law School. It publishes articles and student-written notes that explore how gender issues (and related issues of race, class, sexual orientation, gender identity, and culture) impact law and society.

The journal published its first issue in 1993.

Abstracting and indexing
Articles published in Michigan Journal of Gender & Law are available online at WestLaw, LexisNexis, HeinOnline, and Law Review Commons, as well as at the University of Michigan Law School Scholarship Repository.

References

External links
 

American law journals
University of Michigan
Publications established in 1993
English-language journals
Biannual journals
Law journals edited by students
1993 establishments in Michigan
Law and public policy journals
Journal